Margret Joseph or Margaret Joseph (born 4 January 1999) is a Papua New Guinean footballer who plays as a midfielder for POM FC and the Papua New Guinea women's national team.

She was captain of the under-20 women's team for the 2016 women's world cup qualifiers. She had previously captained the under-15 team at the 2014 youth olympics.

In 2020 she played for PNG club Genesis. She was part of the national team which won gold at the 2019 Pacific Games in Apia. In 2022 she was part of the team which won the 2022 OFC Women's Nations Cup.

Notes

References

1999 births
Living people
Women's association football midfielders
Papua New Guinean women's footballers
Papua New Guinea women's international footballers
Footballers at the 2014 Summer Youth Olympics